The Government of India Act 1858 was an Act of the Parliament of the United Kingdom (21 & 22 Vict. c. 106) passed on 2 August 1858. Its provisions called for the liquidation of the British East India Company (who had up to this point been ruling British India under the auspices of Parliament) and the transference of its functions to the British Crown. Lord Palmerston, then-Prime Minister of the United Kingdom, introduced a bill for the transfer of control of the Government of India from the East India Company to the Crown, referring to the grave defects in the existing system of the government of India. However, before this bill was to be passed, Palmerston was forced to resign on another issue.
Later Edward Stanley, 15th Earl of Derby (who would later become the first Secretary of State for India), introduced another bill which was originally titled as "An Act for the Better Governance of India" and it was passed on 2 August 1858. This act provided that India was to be governed directly and in the name of the Crown.

History
  
The Indian Rebellion of 1857 forced the British Government to pass the Act.  The Act was followed a few months later by Queen Victoria's proclamation to the "Princes, Chiefs, and People of India", which, among other things, stated, "We hold ourselves bound to the natives of our Indian territories by the same obligation of duty which bind us to all our other subjects" (p. 2)

Provisions of the bill

The Company's territories in India were to be vested in the Queen, the Company ceasing to exercise its power and control over these territories. India was to be governed in the Queen's name.
The Queen's Principal Secretary of State received the powers and duties of the Company's Court of Directors. A council of fifteen members was appointed to assist the Secretary of State for India. The council became an advisory body in Indian affairs. For all the communications between Britain and India, the Secretary of State became the real channel.
The Secretary of State for India was empowered to send some secret despatches to India directly without consulting the Council. He was also authorised to constitute special committees of his Council.
The Crown was empowered to appoint a Governor-General and the Governors of the Presidencies.
An Indian Civil Service was to be created under the control of the Secretary of State.
Hereto all the property and other assets of the East India Company were transferred to the Crown. The Crown also assumed the responsibilities of the Company as they related to treaties, contracts, and so forth.

The Act ushered in a new period of Indian history, bringing about the end of Company rule in India. The era of the new British Raj would last until the Partition of India in August 1947, when the territory of the British Raj was granted dominion status as the Dominion of Pakistan and the Dominion of India.

See also
East India Stock Dividend Redemption Act 1873
British Raj
India Office
Governor-General of India
Indian Councils Act 1909
Government of India Act 1935
History of Bangladesh
History of India
History of Pakistan

References

External links 
One Scholar's Bibliography
Government of India Act 1858
Government of India Act, 1858 (21 & 22 Vict. c. 106)

United Kingdom Acts of Parliament 1858
Acts of the Parliament of the United Kingdom concerning India
August 1858 events